The Walls Came Down is the fifth studio album by American country music artist Collin Raye. The album's lead-off single, "I Can Still Feel You", was Raye's fourth and final Number One on the Billboard country charts. Other singles from this album were the Top Five hits "Someone You used to Know" and "Anyone Else", as well as the number 39-peaking "Start Over Georgia", which he co-wrote with his brother Scotty Wray. Although not released as a single, the track "The Eleventh Commandment" was made into a music video, which aired on CMT and TNN (now Spike TV). "Make Sure You've Got It All" was later recorded by Diamond Rio on their 2002 album Completely.

Raye co-produced the album with Paul Worley and Billy Joe Walker, Jr., except for "April Fool", which Worley produced with Ed Seay and John Hobbs.

Track listing

Personnel
As listed in liner notes.

 Eddie Bayers – drums, percussion
 Jon Carroll – piano, Wurlitzer
 Joe Chemay – bass guitar
 Jenna Cowart – background vocals
 Stuart Duncan – fiddle, mandolin
 Wes Hightower – background vocals
 Dann Huff – electric guitar
 Paul Franklin – steel guitar
 Sonny Garrish – steel guitar
 Aubrey Haynie – fiddle, mandolin
 John Hobbs – piano
 Paul Leim – drums
 Brent Mason – electric guitar
 Terry McMillan – percussion, shaker
 Gene Miller – background vocals
 Steve Nathan – piano, synthesizer, Hammond organ
 Michael Omartian – piano
 Collin Raye – lead vocals, background vocals
 Michael Rhodes – bass guitar
 Matt Rollings – piano
 Brent Rowan – electric guitar
 John Wesley Ryles – background vocals
 Will Smith – autoharp
 Randy Waldman – piano, toy piano
 Billy Joe Walker Jr. – acoustic guitar, Baby Taylor guitar, electric guitar
 Biff Watson – acoustic guitar
 Dennis Wilson – background vocals
 Paul Worley – acoustic guitar, 12-string guitar
 Curtis Young – background vocals

String section
 Violins – Murray Adler, Joel Derouin, Julian French, Eric Gorfain, Endre Granat, Gina Kronstadt, Bob Peterson, Bob Sanov
 Violas – Mimi Granat, Jorge Moraga, Carol Muagawa, Harry Shirinian
 Cellos – Glenn Grab, Suzie Katayama, Ray Kelley, Jerry Kessler
 Upright Bass – Jim Hughart, Frances Liu

Charts

Weekly charts

Year-end charts

References

1998 albums
Collin Raye albums
Epic Records albums
Albums produced by Paul Worley
Albums produced by Billy Joe Walker Jr.